Marungapuri Taluk is a taluk of Tiruchirappalli district in the Indian state of Tamil Nadu. It was split from Manaparai taluk in 2013. It hosts a population of about 1.41 lakh in an area of about  Marungapuri taluk has Marungapuri, Valanadu and Thuvarankurichi firkas as its jurisdictional areas. Ponnampatti town panchayat also takes place. The Taluk Office is at M.Kallupatti, three km from Marungapuri.

References 

Taluks of Tiruchirapalli district